Stephan Fabulous Allen (born 11 November 1993), better known by his stage name Dutchavelli, is a British rapper. His name comes in part from the fact that he and his family (including his sister, singer and rapper Stefflon Don) spent their formative years in Rotterdam, and he initially went under the name 'Dutch'. He has worked with artists such as Stormzy, Gzuz and Tion Wayne and has achieved Top 40 hits with songs such as "I Dunno", "Burning" and "808", the former peaking at number 7 in the charts.

Early life 
Stephan Allen was born in Birmingham to parents of Jamaican and Trinidadian descent. He has six siblings and is the fifth born of the seven. When he was a year old, his family moved to Rotterdam, Netherlands, (hence Allen's stage name); around a decade later on they moved back to Clapton in Hackney, East London. He cites that instead of sitting around the dinner table to eat they would play each other music ranging from Bob Marley to Aretha Franklin. After first recording in his teens, although he was spurred on by those around him, at age 17 he was handed a six-year prison sentence for an unspecified offence which delayed the start of his music career.

Career 
Dutchavelli begun his career as Dutch in 2016 releasing songs such as 'New Jack City' whilst making appearances on Rinse FM. Further legal trouble involving a firearm charge in 2018 curtailed his career for another two years while imprisoned on remand (he was later acquitted of the main charge but convicted of an offence relating to witnesses in the case). After being released on licence he began to gain recognition in 2020 with a series of hits which began with 'Only If You Knew' which racked up 20 million views in eight months. Further hits such as 'Surely' alongside collaborations with artists such as Stormzy and M Huncho began to cement his name as one of the leading emerging talents within the drill scene.
Dutchavelli was named on the BBC Sound of... 2021 longlist. 10 artists were nominated by industry experts and artists such as Stormzy, AJ Tracey and Billie Eilish.

In popular culture 
Dutchavelli has gained a reputation for being seen as a tough individual. This, paired with his large stature – he is 6 ft 6 in (1.98 m) in height  – has led to a proliferation of memes relating to this within popular culture.

Personal life

Allen converted to Islam in 2022.

Discography

Mixtapes

Singles

As lead artist

As featured artist

References 

1993 births
Living people
Rappers from Birmingham, West Midlands
English male rappers
English hip hop musicians
Black British male rappers
English people of Jamaican descent
English people of Trinidad and Tobago descent
English expatriates in the Netherlands
People from the London Borough of Hackney
English prisoners and detainees
UK drill musicians
Gangsta rappers
Musicians from Rotterdam
Converts to Islam